Paul Joseph Priddy (born 11 July 1953) is an English retired semi-professional footballer who played as a goalkeeper in the Football League for Brentford and Wimbledon. Priddy holds the record as Aldershot Town's oldest-ever player, after he made an appearance in 1999 at the age of 45 years and 270 days.

Career

Early years 
A goalkeeper, Priddy began his career at Fulham, where he was also a member of the ground staff at Craven Cottage. He was released without making an appearance and dropped into non-League football to join Isthmian League club Hayes. He managed just one appearance on the opening day of the 1971–72 season before departing to join Athenian League Premier Division club Maidenhead United, where he remained until the end of the season.

Brentford 
Priddy moved up to the Football League to sign amateur forms with newly-promoted Third Division club Brentford during the 1972–73 pre-season. Despite being signed as cover for Gordon Phillips, Priddy signed a professional contract in October 1972 and held onto the number one jersey for much of the 1972–73 season, but a run of just five wins in 22 games saw the Bees relegated straight back to the Fourth Division. The loan signing of Steve Sherwood saw Priddy lose his place and he departed Griffin Park in 1974, having made 54 appearances.

Non-League football (1974–1975) 
Priddy dropped back into non-League football in 1974 and joined high-flying Southern League Premier Division club Wimbledon, where he provided cover for Dickie Guy. He later joined Isthmian League club Walton & Hersham and departed in 1975.

Return to Brentford  
Priddy re-joined Brentford, then still in the Fourth Division, as cover for Bill Glazier in 1975. Glazier quit the club after making just 12 appearances and Priddy went on to hold on to the number one jersey until the appointment of manager Bill Dodgin Jr. the following year. Priddy left Brentford for the second time in May 1977 and made 75 appearances during his second spell with the club.

Return to non-League football and second spell with Wimbledon (1977–1980) 
Priddy returned to non-League football in 1977 and joined Isthmian League Premier Division club Tooting & Mitcham United. He returned to Wimbledon for a second spell in October 1978 and with the club by now promoted to the Fourth Division, he made one league appearance deputising for Ray Goddard. Priddy later resumed his non-League career with Wealdstone and Oxford City. He joined Hayes for a second spell in 1980 and made 69 appearances in total for the club.

Third spell with Brentford 
Priddy joined Brentford for a third time on a part-time contract in August 1981, as cover for David McKellar. Now in the Third Division, he made one appearance before departing Griffin Park for the final time at the end of the 1981–82 season. In his three spells with Brentford, Priddy made 130 appearances.

Later years 
Priddy retired in the early 1980s, but came out of retirement to sign with Isthmian League First Division club Hampton in November 1983. A ruptured spleen forced him into retirement for a second time. An injury crisis at Aldershot Town in March 1999 saw Priddy come out of retirement a third time for an Isthmian League Cup semi-final second leg match versus Bromley, in which he helped the club through to the final. The appearance made him Aldershot's oldest-ever player.

Coaching career

Aldershot Town 
Priddy joined Isthmian League club Aldershot Town as goalkeeping coach in July 1992, after being recommended to the club by coach and former Brentford teammate Paul Shrubb. He left the club for a period in November 2001. He remained in the role until late 2009, through the Shots' elevation back to the Football League.

AFC Wimbledon 
Priddy began coaching goalkeepers at non-League club AFC Wimbledon in 2007 and remained in the role until his retirement at the end of the 2012–13 season, by which time the club had been promoted to the Football League.

Career statistics

References

1953 births
Living people
Footballers from Isleworth
English footballers
Association football goalkeepers
Maidenhead United F.C. players
Hayes F.C. players
Brentford F.C. players
Walton & Hersham F.C. players
Wimbledon F.C. players
Tooting & Mitcham United F.C. players
Oxford City F.C. players
Wealdstone F.C. players
Hampton & Richmond Borough F.C. players
Aldershot Town F.C. players
English Football League players
National League (English football) players
Aldershot Town F.C. non-playing staff
AFC Wimbledon non-playing staff
Isthmian League players
Southern Football League players